Clareton is located in the southern part of Weston County, Wyoming, United States, one mile south of State Highway 450. It is within the boundaries of the Thunder Basin National Grassland. The Clareton Oil Field is located south and east of Clareton.

The town of Clareton was first settled by Clarence Arthur Townsend and his family, hence the name Clareton. Clarence built the Grange hall where the store and post office were included.

References

External links
 topquest for topo map and coordinates.
 Base Hunters supercell storm in Clareton

Unincorporated communities in Weston County, Wyoming